Jean-Docile Brousseau (February 24, 1825 – July 28, 1908) was a Canadian politician and newspaper owner.

He was born in Quebec City in 1825. In 1855, he became the official printer for the archbishopric of Quebec and produced the Le Courrier du Canada, a religious newsletter, from 1857 to 1872. He was also involved in the production of Les Soirées canadiennes, a literary review.

In 1861, he was elected to the 7th Parliament of the Province of Canada representing Portneuf; he was re-elected in 1863. In 1867, he was elected as the federal Conservative Member of Parliament in the House of Commons of Canada representing Portneuf.  He was defeated in the election in 1872.

He was then elected councillor for the Quebec City municipal government, a position in which he served from 1875 to 1880 and from 1882 to 1884.  He served as mayor from 1880 to 1882. He also represented Portneuf in the Quebec Legislative Assembly from 1881 to 1885.

He died at Quebec in 1908 after suffering a paralytic stroke.

References 
 
 
 

1825 births
1908 deaths
Members of the House of Commons of Canada from Quebec
Conservative Party of Canada (1867–1942) MPs
Members of the Legislative Assembly of the Province of Canada from Canada East
Mayors of Quebec City
French Quebecers
Conservative Party of Quebec MNAs